Waterproof High School, in Waterproof, Louisiana, in Tensas Parish is a high school whose former building was built in 1926.  The former high school is located on Main St. between Church Lane and Mississippi Street.

The building was designed by W.E. Stephens and W.E. Spink and features a Classical Revival central pavilion.  It was listed on the National Register of Historic Places in 2002.

Athletics
Waterproof High athletics competes in the LHSAA.

Championships
Football Championships
(1) State Championship: 1943

References

School buildings on the National Register of Historic Places in Louisiana
Neoclassical architecture in Louisiana
School buildings completed in 1926
Tensas Parish, Louisiana
1926 establishments in Louisiana